Caparo Vehicle Technologies (CVT), formerly known as Freestream Cars Limited, was a British company that provided advanced technology development, materials engineering, and design services to and markets. Caparo Vehicle Technologies went into administration in 2015, and was fully dissolved by 2019.

History
Caparo Vehicle Technologies was originally founded in 2004 as Freestream Cars Limited by Graham Halstead and Ben Scott-Geddes who had both worked on the McLaren F1 project. In February 2006, Freestream announced a concept car, the Freestream T1.  In March 2006, the company was acquired by Caparo.  The deal was put together by future Commercial Director, Sean Butcher.  After the acquisition, Caparo CEO Angad Paul became chairman.

Vehicles

Caparo Vehicle Technologies produced one vehicle, the Caparo T1.  The T1 is a two seat, rear wheel drive automobile inspired by Formula 1 racecars. The company sold 15 cars by 2012.

Administration and closure
The company entered administration in 2015 just days after the death of Caparo CEO, Angad Paul.  The company was liquidated and fully dissolved by 2019.

See also
Caparo
Caparo T1
 List of car manufacturers of the United Kingdom

References

External links
 Caparo Vehicle Technologies official web site

Automotive companies of the United Kingdom

Sports car manufacturers
2004_establishments_in_England
2019_disestablishments_in_England
British_companies_established_in_2004
Vehicle_manufacturing_companies_disestablished_in_2019
Defunct_motor_vehicle_manufacturers_of_England